The 1984 Boston College Eagles football team represented the Boston College as an independent during the 1984 NCAA Division I-A football season.

Doug Flutie gained national attention in 1984 when he quarterbacked the Eagles to victory in a high-scoring, back-and-forth game against the Miami Hurricanes (led by QB Bernie Kosar). The game was nationally televised on CBS the day after Thanksgiving and thus had a huge audience. Miami staged a dramatic drive to take the lead, 45–41, in the closing minute of the game. Boston College then took possession at its own 22-yard line with 28 seconds to go. After two passes moved the ball another 30 yards, only 6 seconds remained. On the last play of the game, Flutie scrambled away from the defense and threw a Hail Mary pass that was caught in the end zone by senior wide receiver Gerard Phelan, giving BC a 47–45 win. Although many people think that play clinched the Heisman Trophy for Flutie, the voting was already complete before that game.

Boston College finished the season with a 10–2 record and a No. 5 ranking in the final AP Poll. The Eagles defeated the SWC champion Houston Cougars 45–28 in the 1985 Cotton Bowl. The team also captured the Lambert-Meadowlands Trophy (emblematic of the 'Eastern championship' in Division I FBS). 

Flutie left school as the NCAA's all-time passing yardage leader with 10,579 yards and was a consensus All-American as a senior. He earned Player of the Year awards from UPI, Kodak, The Sporting News, and the Maxwell Football Club.

Schedule

Personnel

Rankings

Game summaries

Western Carolina

at Alabama

North Carolina

Temple

at West Virginia

Rutgers

at Penn State

Army

Syracuse

at Miami (FL)

Holy Cross

vs. Houston (Cotton Bowl)

Awards and honors
Doug Flutie, QB, Heisman Trophy
Doug Flutie, QB, Walter Camp Award
Doug Flutie, QB, Maxwell Award
Doug Flutie, QB, Davey O'Brien Award

1984 team players in the NFL
The following players were claimed in the 1985 NFL Draft.

Bill Romanowski was also a member of the team and was drafted in 1988.

References

Boston College
Boston College Eagles football seasons
Lambert-Meadowlands Trophy seasons
Cotton Bowl Classic champion seasons
Boston College Eagles football
Boston College Eagles football